Ugo Amicosante (8 August 1930 – 23 May 2019) was an Italian pistol shooter. He competed in the 25 m rapid-fire pistol event at the 1964 and 1968 Olympics and finished in 18th and 36th place, respectively. At the world championships Amicosante won a bronze medal in 1962 and a gold medal in 1970 with Italian teams.

References

External links
 

1930 births
2019 deaths
Italian male sport shooters
Olympic shooters of Italy
Shooters at the 1964 Summer Olympics
Shooters at the 1968 Summer Olympics
20th-century Italian people